Novoalexandrovka is a rural locality (a settlement) in Volokonovsky District, Belgorod Oblast, Russia. The population was 37 as of 2010. There is 1 street.

Geography 
Novoalexandrovka is located 27 km northwest of Volokonovka (the district's administrative centre) by road. Shidlovka is the nearest rural locality.

References 

Rural localities in Volokonovsky District